Cyperus rockii is a species of sedge that is endemic to parts of Hawaii.

The species was first formally described by the botanist Georg Kükenthal in 1920.

See also
 List of Cyperus species

References

rockii
Taxa named by Georg Kükenthal
Plants described in 1920
Flora of Hawaii